Tonight You're Mine is a 1980 album by Eric Carmen. There is speculation that its title was inspired by the opening line in the Shirelles song "Will You Still Love Me Tomorrow", though this is not confirmed. It peaked at #160 on the Billboard album chart. It contained the singles "It Hurts Too Much" (#75 US Billboard Hot 100 and number three in South Africa) and "All For Love".

Track listing 
All tracks composed by Eric Carmen
 "It Hurts Too Much" - 4:09
 "Lost In The Shuffle" - 4:00
 "All For Love" - 3:59
 "Tonight You're Mine" - 3:59
 "Sleep With Me" - 4:01
 "Inside Story" - 3:37
 "Foolin' Myself" - 5:33
 "You Need Some Lovin'" - 4:02

Personnel 
 Eric Carmen – lead vocals, arrangements, electric guitar (1), backing vocals (6), acoustic piano (7)
 Duane Hitchings – acoustic piano (1-6, 8), synthesizers (1)
 Billy Peek – electric guitar (1, 2, 6), guitar solo (2), rhythm guitar (8)
 Davey Johnstone – acoustic guitar (1, 4), electric guitar (2, 4, 6), backing vocals (4, 6)
 Fred Tackett – acoustic guitar (1, 4, 6), guitar (3, 5)
 Steve Lukather – lead guitar (8)
 Kenny Passarelli – bass (1, 2, 4, 6-8)
 Bob Glaub – bass (3, 5)
 Carmine Appice – drums (1, 2, 4, 6, 8)
 Rick Shlosser – drums (3, 5, 7)
 Paulinho da Costa – percussion (1, 4)
 Harry Maslin – percussion (3, 5)
 David Woodford – saxophone (1, 6)
 Calvin H. Biggar – bagpipes (4)
 Angus MacKay – bagpipes (4)
 David Stanley Moyle – bagpipes (4)
 Argyle Watterston – bagpipes (4)
 Barry Fasman – string arrangements (1, 3, 5, 7)
 Laura Creamer – backing vocals (1, 4)
 Jim Haas – backing vocals (1, 3, 4)
 Jon Joyce – backing vocals (1, 4)
 Dee Dee Maslin and the Shuflettes – backing vocals (2)
 Steve Farber – backing vocals (3)
 Joanne Harris – backing vocals (3)

Production 
 Harry Maslin – producer, engineer, mixing 
 Rick Ash – assistant engineer 
 Frank D'Amico – assistant engineer
 Sheridan Eldridge – assistant engineer
 Bill Thomas – assistant engineer
 John Van Nest – assistant engineer
 Ria Lewerke-Shapiro – art direction, design, photography 
 Recorded and Mixed at Cherokee Studios (Los Angeles, California) and Allen Zentz Recording (San Clemente, California).

References

Eric Carmen albums
1980 albums
Arista Records albums